"Cordially Invited to Meet Death" is a Nero Wolfe mystery novella by Rex Stout, first published in abridged form as "Invitation to Murder" in the April 1942 issue of The American Magazine. It first appeared in book form in the short-story collection Black Orchids, published by Farrar & Rinehart in 1942.

Plot summary

Bess Huddleston arranges parties for New York society. She has been in contact with Wolfe once before, when she wanted him to play the detective at a party that would feature a mock murder; Wolfe declined to participate. Now, she comes with one anonymous letter in hand and a report of another. They were not sent to her, nor do they threaten her directly: rather, one was sent to a client and the other to a member of the circle in which her clients move. The letters imply strongly that Miss Huddleston has been gossiping about her clients' private lives.

She wants Wolfe to put an end to the smear campaign – if it continues, her monied clients will no longer trust her and will not hire her to arrange their parties. Miss Huddleston has two employees, an assistant party arranger named Janet Nichols and a secretary named Maryella Timms. Both have access to a box of stationery of the same kind used for the letters. The letters are typewritten, and appear to Miss Huddleston's eye to have been typed on one of her typewriters. Wolfe tells Miss Huddleston to have Miss Nichols and Miss Timms come to his office.

They do so, and arrive at a moment when Wolfe and Fritz are discussing another attempt at cooking corned beef. This has long been a problem in the brownstone's kitchen, one never satisfactorily resolved. Miss Timms hears about the dilemma and barges into the kitchen to help. Wolfe is so impressed by Miss Timms' expertise that he later allows her to link arms with him, and writes to a professor at Harvard concerning chitlins and corned beef.

Apart from the culinary, though, Wolfe obtains no useful information from Nichols and Timms, and sends Archie to Miss Huddleston's house and place of business to investigate further. There, Archie is bedeviled by a playful chimpanzee, two pet bears and an alligator. He also meets Miss Huddleston's brother Daniel, her nephew Larry, and Alan Brady, an MD who has been spending time with Janet Nichols. Archie does not get much further at the house than Wolfe did in his office, but he has cocktails on the terrace with the various players. As the butler is bringing more drinks, the chimpanzee startles him and a tray of glasses crashes to the ground. Most of the broken glass is cleaned up, but Miss Huddleston's foot is cut by a shard and, because of the presence of the animals, Dr. Brady treats the cut with iodine.

Less than one week later, Miss Huddleston is dead, having undergone an excruciatingly painful and drawn out death from tetanus. That, as far as Wolfe is concerned, ends his involvement, but Daniel Huddleston makes a nuisance of himself with the police: he believes his sister was murdered. Daniel is insistent enough that Inspector Cramer comes to Wolfe looking for information. Wolfe has none for him, but after Cramer leaves he drops Archie an exiguous hint: he thinks there is one thing that Cramer should have done during his investigation, and wonders if it has rained during the past week.

Cast of characters
Nero Wolfe — The private investigator
Archie Goodwin — Wolfe's assistant (and the narrator of all Wolfe stories)
Bess Huddleston — Party arranger for members of the Social Register
Mister, Logo, Lulu and Moses — Miss Huddleston's pet chimp, bears and alligator
Janet Nichols — Miss Huddleston's assistant
Maryella Timms — Miss Huddleston's secretary
Daniel Huddleston — A research chemist and Miss Huddleston's brother
Larry Huddleston — Another assistant party arranger employed by Miss Huddleston, and her nephew
Alan Brady — A local medical doctor who has become friendly with the Huddleston household
Inspector Cramer — Representing Manhattan Homicide

The unfamiliar word
In most Nero Wolfe novels and novellas, there is at least one unfamiliar word, usually spoken by Wolfe. "Cordially Invited to Meet Death" contains this word, first spoken by Daniel Huddleston:
 Catholicon. Chapter 7.

Publication history

"Cordially Invited to Meet Death"
1942, The American Magazine, April 1942, as "Invitation to Murder"
1943, The Philadelphia Inquirer, a Gold Seal Novel, May 16, 1943, as "Cordially Invited"
New York: Lawrence E. Spivak, Jonathan Press #15, not dated, paperback
1956, New York: Avon #738 (with Edgar Allan Poe's "Some Words with a Mummy"), 1956, paperback
New York: Hillman Periodicals, not dated
1998, Burlington, Ontario: Durkin Hayes Publishing, DH Audio  August 1998, audio cassette (unabridged, read by David Elias), "Cordially Invited to Meet Death")

Black Orchids
1942, New York: Farrar & Rinehart, May 21, 1942, hardcover
Contents include "Black Orchids" and "Cordially Invited to Meet Death".
In his limited-edition pamphlet, Collecting Mystery Fiction #9, Rex Stout's Nero Wolfe Part I, Otto Penzler describes the first edition of Black Orchids: "Brick brown cloth, front cover and spine printed with black; rear cover blank. Issued in a brick brown and green pictorial dust wrapper … The first edition has the publisher's monogram logo on the copyright page."
In April 2006, Firsts: The Book Collector's Magazine estimated that the first edition of Black Orchids had a value of between $3,000 and $5,000. The estimate is for a copy in very good to fine condition in a like dustjacket.
1942, Toronto: Oxford University Press, 1942, hardcover
1942, New York: Detective Book Club #5, August 1942, hardcover
1943, London: Collins Crime Club, July 5, 1943, hardcover
1943, New York: Grosset & Dunlap, 1943, hardcover
1945, Cleveland, Ohio: World Publishing Company, a Tower Book, March 1945, hardcover
1946, New York: Avon #95, 1946, paperback
1963, New York: Pyramid (Green Door) #R-917, September 1963, paperback
1992, New York: Bantam Crimeline  May 1992, trade paperback
1996, Burlington, Ontario: Durkin Hayes Publishing, DH Audio, "Black Orchids"  December 1996, audio cassette (unabridged, read by Saul Rubinek)
1998, Burlington, Ontario: Durkin Hayes Publishing, DH Audio  August 1998, audio cassette (unabridged, read by David Elias), "Cordially Invited to Meet Death"
2009, New York: Bantam Dell Publishing Group (with The Silent Speaker)  August 25, 2009, trade paperback
2010, New York: Bantam Crimeline  June 30, 2010, e-book

Adaptations

Nero Wolfe (CBC Radio)
"Cordially Invited to Meet Death" was adapted as the sixth episode of the Canadian Broadcasting Corporation's 13-part radio series Nero Wolfe (1982), starring Mavor Moore as Nero Wolfe, Don Francks as Archie Goodwin, and Cec Linder as Inspector Cramer. Written and directed by Toronto actor and producer Ron Hartmann, the hour-long adaptation aired on CBC Stereo February 20, 1982.

References

External links

1942 short stories
Nero Wolfe short stories
Works originally published in The American Magazine